Cypress Provincial Park is a provincial park on the North Shore of Metro Vancouver Regional District, British Columbia. The park has two sections: a  southern section which is accessible by road, and a  northern section which is only accessible by hiking trails. Most of the park is in West Vancouver.

The southern section of Cypress Provincial Park contains a ski area (Cypress Mountain Ski Area) that is operated under a Park Use Permit by a private company called Cypress Bowl Recreations Ltd, a subsidiary of Boyne USA. Boyne USA recently sold the ski operation to CNL Income Properties of Florida, USA, but Boyne will continue to run the ski operation for several years under a lease-back agreement.

History 
Logging first began in 1870 to clear cut dense forests along Mount Vaughen, also known as Hollyburn Mountain. In 1922, the Lions Gate Bridge had still not been built; instead, Vancouverites would take their boats across the inlet and hike up to Hollyburn Ridge to ski. By 1926, the Hollyburn Lodge was built on Hollyburn Ridge, for the use of skiers and snowshoers. On January 16, 1927, the Hollyburn Ski Camp opened and created a new interest in the ski area. In 1933, the West Lake Ski Camp officially opened and brought hundreds of curious skiers that were willing to hike up the mountain. In 1946, the West Lake Ski Camp was sold to new owners and renamed the Hollyburn Ski Lodge. On January 17, 1951, the first chairlift was officially opened and was called the Hollyburn chair. In 1970, BC Parks selected the ski area as a provincial park. Shortly after, Cypress Ski Area was officially opened. For the next three decades, infrastructure was put in place to facilitate the growing demand of recreationists wanting to use the area. In 2010, Cypress helped host the 2010 Winter Olympics in Vancouver.

The early history on the establishment of Cypress provincial park is missing. It was first created around 1942, and stood in abeyance. The controversy about logging in the provincial park, under the oversight of the Social Credit government in the mid to late 1960s, was debated in the BC Legislature and reported on in the media.

Climate

Winter season 

During the winter, this is a ski area for both cross-country and alpine skiers. The ski operation has four quad (2 are high speed) and two double chairlifts, as well as a tube tow and a magic carpet for their ski school participants. It also has the highest vertical rise, of the three North Shore ski resorts.

Summer use 

In summer and fall, the park is usually free of snow and is popular with hikers. Its trail system includes sections of the Baden-Powell Trail in the southern section of the park, as well as the Howe Sound Crest Trail in the northern section.  Parkbus offers a seasonal shuttle service to the park.

Beginning in the summer of 2005, Cypress Mountain Resort has created a lift-assisted mountain bike park, as set out in the 1997 Cypress Provincial Park Master Plan. Even though the lift accessed biking has now been closed for Olympic preparations and they have not yet bothered to restore the trails Cypress still hold many non-lift accessed bike trails. Most of these trails are situated lower down the mountain and are actually not a part of the park because of this they are under threat to development. These Trails on Cypress (Black Mountain Side) are known around the world for being some of the most technically challenging in the world, more challenging than the other two shore mountains (Seymour and Fromme). Trails on Cypress are known as being steep, eroded, and very dangerous. It has multiple rock faces that are close to vertical also having large jumps and drops. That being said Cypress does house some more easily ridable trails, still not easy by any means but more accessible. Some of these include: Mystery DH, Stupid Grouse, Slippery Canoe, Upper Tall Cans, Firehose, and Pull Tab. Some of the legendary and most difficult trails are: 5th Horseman, Sex Girl, Shoreplay. One of the original trails is pre-reaper and reaper these are steep trails that used to have some very difficult man made features, sadly most of these were sawed down and destroyed by the government. For more information regarding trails on Cypress there are mountain bike specific maps that include many of the trails and is a great place to start for riding on the mountain.

Major mountains in the park 

The lower section of the park contains three main mountains that form Cypress Bowl: Mt. Strachan, Black Mountain, and Hollyburn Mountain. 
The upper, smaller, section includes a series of mountains along a north–south ridge from St. Mark's in the south to Unnecessary Mountain, the Lions, Thomas Peak, David Peak, James Peak, Mt. Harvey, Brunswick Mountain, Hat Mountain, Mt. Hanover, Wettin Peak, Coburg Peak, and Gotha Peak in the far north of the park.

2010 Olympics 
A significant part of Vancouver's 2010 Winter Olympics was hosted by Cypress in February 2010, including the snowboard (half-pipe, snowboard cross and parallel giant slalom) and freestyle skiing (moguls and aerials) events, as well as the recently added Skiercross, which used the snowboardcross run, with some modifications. The Freestyle Venue was completed in the Fall of 2006.

References

External links 

Friends of Cypress Provincial Park

Provincial parks of British Columbia
West Vancouver
Venues of the 2010 Winter Olympics
Tourism in British Columbia
1975 establishments in British Columbia
Protected areas established in 1975